During the Tunisian Revolution President Zine El Abidine Ben Ali fled Tunisia on 14 January 2011 Prime Minister Mohamed Ghannouchi then briefly took over as Acting President. On the morning of 15 January 2011 Ghannouchi had handed over the presidency to Speaker of the Chamber of Deputies Fouad Mebazaa, This was done after the head of Tunisia's Constitutional Council, Fethi Abdennadher declared that Ghannouchi did not have right to power and confirmed Fouad Mebazaa as Acting President under Article 57 of the 1959 Constitution. Ghannouchi returning to his previous position as prime minister was confirmed as prime minister by Mebazaa and formed a new national unity government on 17 January 2011 that included members of opposition parties, civil society representatives, and even a blogger who only a week previous had been imprisoned by the regime of the deposed President. On 27 February 2011 the government was dissolved and replaced by a new government led by Beji Caid Essebsi.

Cabinet members 

As of 17 January members included:

Resignations

Ministers from the opposition
On 18 January 2011 the three ministers of the Tunisian General Labor Union (UGTT), Houssine Dimassi, Abdeljelil Bédoui and Anouar Ben Gueddour resign. The same day, Mustapha Ben Jaafar, from Ettakatol, also resigned. they all stated that they had "no confidence" in a government featuring members of the RCD.

RCD members
Following the various protests that followed after the formation of this government, Prime Minister Mohamed Ghannouchi and interim President Fouad Mebazaa announce that they are no longer members of the Democratic Constitutional Rally. On 20 January the other ministers still members of the RCD announced that they had done the same: they were Kamel Morjane, Ridha Grira, Ahmed Friaâ, Moncer Rouissi and Zouheir M'dhaffer. The same day M'Dhaffer a close confidant of Ben Ali in charge of Administrative Development also resigned from his ministerial functions. Kamel Morjane resigned from the government on 27 January a few hours before the government reshuffle.

Reshuffle of 27 January 
Following protests against the presence of RCD members in important positions and the resignation of several ministers, the government was reshuffled on 27 January 2011. The UGTT decided not to participate but supported the new government.

Cabinet members

Other changes 
On 10 February 2011 Ridha Belhaj is sworn in as Secretary of State to the Prime Minister. Foreign Minister Ahmed Ounaies resigns on 13 February 2011 following his remarks on the revolution, he had hailed Minister of Europe and Foreign Affairs of France Michèle Alliot-Marie as " friend of Tunisia", while the minister was summoned at the same time to explain herself in France for having offered the regime of Ben Ali the "know-how" of the French police to quell the protests when the repression was in full swing. he is replaced by Mouldi Kefi on 21 February 2011.

Resignation of the Prime Minister 
Protests flared on 19 February, with 40,000 protesters demanding a new interim government completely free of association with the old regime, and a parliamentary system of government replacing the current presidential one. As a date was announced for an election in mid-July 2011, more than 100,000 protesters demanded the removal of Ghannouchi. On 27 February, following two days of demonstrations marked by violence in the capital in which five protesters were killed and twelve injured. Ghannouchi announced his resignation on state television, He stated that he had carried his responsibilities since Ben Ali fled, and "I am not ready to be the person who takes decisions that would end up causing casualties. This resignation will serve Tunisia, and the revolution and the future of Tunisia he added.

Following him the ministers Ahmed Néjib Chebbi, Ahmed Brahim, Elyès Jouini, Afif Chelbi and Mohamed Nouri Jouini notably announced their resignation.

Ghannouchi was replaced as Prime Minister the same day by Beji Caid Essebsi.

References

Tunisian Revolution
Ghannouchi
Cabinets established in 2011
2011 establishments in Tunisia
Cabinets disestablished in 2011
2011 disestablishments in Tunisia
2011 in Tunisian politics